Ole Rex is a 1961 American action film directed by Robert Hinkle and written by Robert Hinkle and Jack Specht. The film stars Billy Hughes, Bill Coontz, Robert Hinkle, Whitey Hughes, William Hughes and Richard McCarty. The film was released on May 1, 1961, by Universal Pictures.

Plot

Cast         
Billy Hughes 		
Bill Coontz
Robert Hinkle 		
Whitey Hughes	
William Hughes	
Richard McCarty
Red Bray
Robert Marlow Jr.
Dale Terry

References

External links
 

1961 films
American action films
1960s action films
Universal Pictures films
1960s English-language films
1960s American films